A slipped half hitch  is a knot in which the weight of the load the rope carries depresses the loop sufficiently to keep it in place until the load item is placed in its location. When no longer required the free end may be pulled and draw the loop through and so release the load.

The Overhand Noose
is sometimes used as a Slip Knot to form the loops of a Trucker's Hitch, or as a Stopper. Double Noose is used in arboriculture to fix a rope to a carabiner. Today this knot is mistakenly named like Barrel Hitch.

Similar knots

See also
List of knots

References 

Running knots